The 1959 Texas A&I Javelinas football team was an American football team that represented the Texas College of Arts and Industries (now known as Texas A&M University–Kingsville) as a member of the Lone Star Conference during the 1959 NAIA football season. The team compiled a 12–1 record, defeated  in the Holiday Bowl, and won the NAIA Football National Championship. It was the first of seven NAIA Football National Championships won by the school (1959, 1969, 1970, 1974, 1975, 1976, and 1979).

Season overview
In its sixth year under head coach Gil Steinke, the team compiled a 12–1 record (6–1 against conference opponents), tied for the Lone Star Conference championship, and defeated  in the Holiday Bowl to win the NAIA national championship.

However, Howard Payne forfeited the game two weeks later due to its use of an academically ineligible sophomore guard.

The shutout snapped Hillsdale's streak of 56 games (dating to November 7, 1953) without being held scoreless. The game was watched by an estimated 15 million viewers on CBS Television. Texas A&I faced undefeated Lenoir Rhyne and prevailed by a 20–6 score as sophomore quarterback Jerrell Hayes threw touchdown passes covering 32, 74 and 57 yards. Two of the touchdown passes were caught by halfback Butch Pressley and the other by track star Dick Watson. Pressley totaled 101 rushing yards and 89 receiving yards in the game.

The team played its home games at Javelina Stadium in Kingsville, Texas.

Honors and awards
Six Texas A&I players received first- or second-team honors on the All-Lone Star Conference team selected the conference coaches: guard Gerald Lambert (first); center James Franz (first); halfbacks Barry Copenhaver (second) and Harold Hees (second); fullback Butch Pressley (second); and end Lupe Jaimes (second).

Schedule

References

Texas AandI
Texas A&M–Kingsville Javelinas football seasons
NAIA Football National Champions
Lone Star Conference football champion seasons
Texas AandI Javelinas football